Hamana may refer to:

Lake Hamana, Shizuoka Prefecture, Japan
Hamana District, Shizuoka, Japan
Hamana High School, Hamamatsu, Japan
, several ships
Hamana (leafhopper), a genus in subfamily Iassinae

People with the surname
, Japanese animation director

See also
Gberedou/Hamana, a region in Guinea
Tsugaru-Hamana Station, Japan